Brian Clyde (born August 19, 1977) is an American film director, screenwriter, and producer.

Biography
Brian Clyde was born and raised in Manhattan. He graduated from New York University's Tisch School of the Arts in 1999 with a BFA in Film Production. His senior thesis, Criminal Obsession, won Best Short Narrative at the Seattle Underground Film Festival in 2000. This caught the eye of filmmaker Roger Corman, who decided to finance Clyde's first feature, Rage and Discipline, which Clyde wrote and directed. Rage and Discipline received a favorable review from Ronnie Scheib of Variety and an Honorable Mention at the African Diaspora Film Festival.

Clyde went on to direct two more feature films for Roger Corman and then completed Growing, a feature-length documentary about small, sustainable farms in the Hudson Valley region of New York State.

Filmography

Awards

References

External links
 Official Website of Brian Clyde
 

American film directors
American film producers
American male screenwriters
1977 births
Living people
Tisch School of the Arts alumni